Pascale de Boysson (16 April 1922–9 August 2002) was a French film, television and stage actress who also adapted and translated plays for the French stage. She was a two-time winner of the Molière Award, winning it in 1988 and posthumously in 2003.

Biography
Born as Marie Thérèse Antoinette Pascale de Boysson in April 1922 at Château de Châtillon in the commune of Chindrieux, she was one of ten children born to the aristocratic Louis de Boysson (1881-1971), a Director of the Paris Railroad Company in Orléans who married Marie Jeanne d'Anglejan-Châtillon in 1912. She was a pupil of Charles Dullin and Tania Balachova.  In 1961 after meeting Laurent Terzieff she became his life partner and led the company Terzieff founded in 1961. She starred in more than fifty plays and the show Le Babil des classes dangereuses, which she helped to create in January 1984.

She adapted works by Murray Schisgal, Arnold Wesker and Sławomir Mrożek and in 2003 she posthumously received a Molière Award as the best adapter of a foreign work for Le Regard by Murray Schisgal. She also appeared in more than thirty films or TV movies, and lent her voice to the film L'Histoire sans fin, the French-language version of The NeverEnding Story. Her film roles include Gasparine in Lovers of Paris (1957), the bar owner in Seven Days... Seven Nights (1960), Sister Cécile in Dialogue with the Carmelites (1960), La servante des Boule in Amelie or The Time to Love (1961), Elisabeth Lapeyre in Les Abysses (1963), Simone in The Shameless Old Lady (1965), Blanche in Le Maître de pension (1973), Véronique in Il n'y a pas de fumée sans feu (1973) and Mrs Clare in Tess (1979).

She died aged 80 on 9 August 2002 in La Noue and was buried at Coux-et-Bigaroque in the Dordogne.

Jean-Jacques Aillagon, the French Minister of Culture and Communication, paid homage to Pascale de Boysson on the day of her death: 
"With Pascale de Boysson, we lose a great actress, but also a remarkable adaptator who had the rare gift of translating the foreign playwrights she loved to the French public, without ever betraying its character and genius.  We waited with impatience to find her on the boards, at the beginning, in her adaptation of The Gaze by Murray Schisgal, an author who was particularly dear to her.  Her meeting with Laurent Terzieff, her companion in the city as on the stage, was for her determining.  For her, but also for the public, since this meeting was to be at the origin of a company that remains, 40 years after its foundation, one of the beautiful theatrical adventures of our time." 

When the Molière Award was awarded to Pascale de Boysson a few months after her death, it was Laurent Terzieff who thanked the profession and paid tribute to the one who was his partner and companion: 
"It is on the job, and often in a hurry, that, as part of her actress activities within our company, Pascale de Boysson has been brought to translate the texts of Schisgal, Saunders, Friel and others... She did so with both great humility and great ease, not looking for resemblance at all costs through agreed equivalences, but on the contrary imposing a difference, sometimes dissonances, by digging a groove in our language, enriching it with a new sound, the tone of the song of an author from elsewhere. It's still difficult for me to talk about Pascale. I feel the clumsiness of the burglar who would be forced to force his own safe, as it says somewhere in a novel by Faulkner. I will only say that I consider this prize as a last tribute of the profession to Pascale de Boysson, to that independent, generous and gratuitous life she had given herself."
On 2 July 2015 the place Laurent-Terzieff-and-Pascale-of-Boysson was inaugurated in Paris, in the 6th district.

Filmography

Cinema
1957 : Pot-Bouille 
1960 : Moderato cantabile
1960 : Dialogue with the Carmelites
1961 : Amelie or The Time to Love 
1962 : Yannick Bellon's Marriage Office 
1963 : All Who Fall
1963 : Les Abysses
1964 : The Adage 
1964 : Widows
1965 : The Shameless Old Lady
1966 : The Second Truth
1970 : Madly
1973 : Il n'y a pas de fumée sans feu
1973 : Le Maître de pension
1975 : Aloïse 
1978 : Perceval le Gallois
1979 : Tess by Roman Polanski
1982 : Little Joseph 
1985 : The Ragazza dei lilla
1992 : The Guéla 
1994 : The Raft of the Medusa
2003 : Rien, voilà l'ordre

Television
1963 : The camera explores the time: The Truth on Stellio Lorenzi's Lyon mail case 
1964 : The camera explores the weather: Mata-Hari by Guy Lessertisseur 
1967 : Hedda Gabler
1973 : The Pension Master  
1974 : Yellow grassy waves
1974 : The Birds of the Moon
1975 : Bérénice de Racine
1976 : Milady after Paul Morand, directed by François Leterrier 
1978 : The Rope on Marcel Moussy's Neck 
1981 : The Journey of the Dutchman 
1983 : The Arrow in the Heart (La freccia nel fianco) 
1986 : Nazi Hunter: The Beate Klarsfeld Story
1988 : A Doctor of Lights
1988 : The Last Five Minutes: Gilles Katz's Last Grand Prize 
1992 : Liebesreise
1996 : Laurent Terzieff, the secret documentary man by Léon Desclozeaux 
1997 : Baldi: Baldi and the Rich Little Ones by Claude of Anna and Michel Mees

Theatre

Actress
1952 : The Shoemaker's Prodigious Wife by Federico García Lorca, directed by Raymond Hermantier, Theater of Humor 
1954 : The Morning of a Man of Letters by Tania Balachova after Anton Chekhov, directed by Tania Balachova, Théâtre de la Huchette 
1954 : Yerma by Federico García Lorca , directed by Guy Suarès , Théâtre de la Huchette 
1955 : The Seagull by Anton Chekhov, directed by André Barsacq, Théâtre de l'Atelier 
1955 : The Moon Birds by Marcel Aymé, directed by André Barsacq , Théâtre de l'Atelier 
1956 : Hedda Gabler by Henrik Ibsen, directed by Guy Suarès, Franklin Theater 
1958 : Miguel Mañana by Oscar Milosz, directed by Maurice Jacquemont, Studio des Champs-Élysées 
1958 : When Five Years Pass by Federico García Lorca, directed by Guy Suarès, Théâtre Récamier 
1959 : L'Échange  by Paul Claudel, directed by Guy Suarès, Aix-en-Provence 
1961 : The Thought, after Leonid Andreyev, adaptation Carlos Semprun, directed by Laurent Terzieff, Théâtre de Lutèce and Théâtre Hébertot  (1962) 
1961 : Les Nourrices by Romain Weingarten, directed by the author, Théâtre de Lutèce 
1962 : L'Échange  by Paul Claudel, directed by Guy Suarès, Théâtre Hébertot 
1963 :  The Tiger by Murray Schisgal, directed by Maurice Garrel and Laurent Terzieff , Théâtre de Lutèce 
1963 : The Typists by Murray Schisgal, directed by Maurice Garrel and Laurent Terzieff, Théâtre de Lutèce 
1965 : Love by Murray Schisgal, directed by Maurice Garrel, Théâtre Montparnasse
1966 : The Neighbours by James Saunders, directed by Laurent Terzieff, Théâtre de Lutèce
1967 : The Neighbours by James Saunders, directed by Laurent Terzieff, Théâtre de Lutèce
1967 : Tango by Sławomir Mrożek, adaptation Georges Lisowski and Claude Roy, directed by Laurent Terzieff, Théâtre de Lutèce 
1968 : Child's Play by Carol Bernstein, directed Laurent Terzieff , Odéon-Théâtre de l'Europe 
1968 : The Neighbours by James Saunders, directed by Laurent Terzieff, Théâtre du Vieux-Colombier 
1968 : Fragments and The Chinese by Murray Schisgal, directed by Laurent Terzieff, Théâtre du Vieux-Colombier 
1969 : The Waltz of the Dogs by Leonid Andreyev, adaptation Laurent Terzieff, directed by Carlos Wittig, Théâtre du Vieux-Colombier 
1969 : David, the Night Falls by Bernard Kops, directed Yves Gasc, Comedy of the West 
1971 : The Sleeping Man by Carlos Semprún, directed by Laurent Terzieff, Théâtre du Lucernaire 
1971 : Here ... Now by Claude Mauriac, directed by Laurent Terzieff, Théâtre du Lucernaire 
1971 : The Neighbours by James Saunders, directed by Laurent Terzieff, tour 
1972 : The Stork by Armand Gatti, directed by Pierre Debauche, Théâtre Nanterre-Amandiers 
1972 : David, the Night Falls by Bernard Kops, directed André Barsacq, Theatre Workshop 
1973 : Isma, ou ce qui s’appelle rien by Nathalie Sarraute, directed by Claude Régy, Espace Pierre Cardin 
1973 : Rubezahl, scenes of Don Juan by Oscar Milosz, directed by Laurent Terzieff, Théâtre du Lucernaire 
1974 : Rubezahl, scenes of Don Juan by Oscar Milosz, directed by Laurent Terzieff, Théâtre Montansier 
1974 : La Mandore by Romain Weingarten, directed by Daniel Benoin,  Théâtre Daniel Sorano Vincennes  
1974 : Folies bourgeoises - La Petite Illustration by Roger Planchon, directed by Roger Planchon, Comédie de Saint-Étienne 
1975 : AA, Theatres of Arthur Adamov by Arthur Adamov, directed by Roger Planchon, TNP Villeurbanne and 1976, Théâtre national de Chaillot 
1976 : Folies bourgeoises - The Little Illustration, directed by Roger Planchon, Théâtre de la Porte-Saint-Martin 
1977 : Box and Quotations from Chairman Mao Tse-Tung by Edward Albee, adaptation Matthieu Galey, directed by Laurent Terzieff, Théâtre du Lucernaire 
1978 : One Hour with Rainer Maria Rilke after Rainer Maria Rilke, directed by Laurent Terzieff, Théâtre du Lucernaire 
1978 : Fragments by Murray Schisgal, directed by Laurent Terzieff, Théâtre du Lucernaire 
1979 : The Hunchback by Sławomir Mrożek, directed by Laurent Terzieff, Théâtre national de Chaillot 
1980 :  The Hunchback by Sławomir Mrożek, directed by Laurent Terzieff, Théâtre Hébertot 
1980 : Milosz after Oscar Milosz, directed by Laurent Terzieff, Théâtre du Lucernaire 
1981 : An Hour with Rainer Maria Rilke after Rainer Maria Rilke, directed by Laurent Terzieff, Théâtre de La Criée 
1981 : Milosz after Oscar Milosz, directed by Laurent Terzieff, Théâtre du Lucernaire 
1981 : The Friends of Arnold Wesker, directed by Yves Gasc, Théâtre du Lucernaire 
1983 : Milosz after Oscar Milosz, directed by Laurent Terzieff, Théâtre Renaud-Barrault 
1984 : The Babble of Dangerous Classes by Valère Novarina, directed by Jean Gillibert, Théâtre de la Criée, Centre Georges Pompidou
1984 : American Healing by James Saunders, directed by Laurent Terzieff, Theater 13, Théâtre La Bruyère
1986 : Testimonies on Brian Friel's Ballyberg, adaptation Pol Quentin, directed by Laurent Terzieff, Théâtre du Lucernaire  
1986 : The Women Scholars of Molière, directed by Françoise Seigner, Théâtre Boulogne-Billancourt 
1988 : What Fox Sees by James Saunders, directed by Laurent Terzieff, La Bruyère Theater 
1989 : Henry IV by Luigi Pirandello, adaptation and staging Armand Delcampe, Théâtre de l'Atelier 
1990 : What Fox Sees by James Saunders, directed by Laurent Terzieff, Théâtre Hébertot 
1991 : William Shakespeare's Richard II, directed by Yves Gasc, Théâtre des Célestins, Théâtre de l'Atelier 
1993 : Another Time by Ronald Harwood, directed by Laurent Terzieff, Théâtre La Bruyère 
1994 : Another Time by Ronald Harwood, directed by Laurent Terzieff, Théâtre des Célestins
1997 : The Bonnet du fou by Luigi Pirandello, directed by Laurent Terzieff, Théâtre de l'Athénée and 1998 Théâtre de l'Atelier 
2000 : Burned by the Ice by Peter Asmussen, directed by Laurent Terzieff, Théâtre 14 Jean-Marie Serreau 
2000 : Bertold Brecht, Poems of Bertolt Brecht, directed by Laurent Terzieff, House of Poetry , and 2001  Théâtre de la Gaîté-Montparnasse
2001 : Me, Bertold Brecht by Bertolt Brecht, directed by Laurent Terzieff, Théâtre de la Gaîté-Montparnasse

Adapter
1965 : Love by Murray Schisgal, Théâtre Montparnasse
1966 : Alas, poor Fred! by James Saunders, directed by Laurent Terzieff, Théâtre de Lutèce
1968 : Fragments by Murray Schisgal, directed by Laurent Terzieff, Théâtre du Vieux-Colombier 
1984 : The Typists and the Tiger by Murray Schisgal, adaptation with Laurent Terzieff, Théâtre de Dix-heures

Translator
1982 : The Ambassador by Sławomir Mrożek, translation with the author and Laurent Terzieff, directed by Laurent Terzieff , Théâtre Renaud-Barrault

Awards and Appointments
Molière Award 1988: Best Supporting Actress
Molière Award 2003: as the adapter for Le Regard (posthumous) - Théâtre Rive Gauche

References

External links
Pascale de Boysson on the Internet Movie Database

1922 births
2002 deaths
20th-century French actresses
21st-century French actresses
French television actresses
French film actresses
French stage actresses